The 1917 Cork Intermediate Hurling Championship was the ninth staging of the Cork Intermediate Hurling Championship since its establishment by the Cork County Board.

Emmets won the championship following a 5-1 to 5-0 defeat of Mallow in the final.

Results

Final

References

Cork Intermediate Hurling Championship
Cork Intermediate Hurling Championship